"I'll See Him Through" is a song written by Billy Sherrill and Norro Wilson, and recorded by American country music artist Tammy Wynette. It released in December 1969 as the first single from the album Tammy's Touch.

Background and reception
"I'll See Him Through" was first recorded in November 1969 at the Columbia Recording Studio in Nashville, Tennessee. Additional tracks were recorded during this session, which would ultimately become part of Wynette's studio album Tammy's Touch. The session was produced by Billy Sherrill and the song was issued as a single in December 1969.

The song reached number 2 on the Billboard Hot Country Singles chart and number 100 on the Billboard Hot 100 chart in 1969. "I'll See Him Through" became Wynette's ninth top 10 hit on the country songs chart. It released on her studio album Tammy's Touch.

Track listings
7" vinyl single
 "I'll See Him Through" – 2:51
 "Enough of a Woman" – 2:05

Charts

Weekly charts

References 

1969 songs
1969 singles
Epic Records singles
Tammy Wynette songs
Song recordings produced by Billy Sherrill
Songs written by Billy Sherrill
Songs written by Norro Wilson